Courtney Ann Gibbs-Mokarow (née Gibbs; born August 20, 1966) is an American actress, model and beauty pageant titleholder who won Miss USA 1988 and Top 10 semifinalist at Miss Universe 1988.

Miss USA
Born to Charles Gaylord Gibbs and Susan Eckardt-Gibbs, Mokarow participated in the 1988 Miss USA pageant as Miss Texas USA, winning the title and becoming the fourth of five consecutive winners from Texas during the 1980s.

At the 1988 Miss Universe pageant, she placed first in the preliminary competition, ninth in semifinal interview, eighth in swimsuit and sixth in evening gown, finishing her participation in eighth place.

Life after Miss USA
Following her pageantry career, Mokarow married former Another World star Tom Eplin and went into acting, portraying Assistant District Attorney Galen Henderson on All My Children for a brief time in 1992.

In 1999, she married husband Kevin, a Dallas businessman, with whom she has one son, Grayson, and one daughter, Evelyn.

Filmography

References

External links
Official Miss USA website - Past titleholders

1966 births
Living people
Miss Universe 1988 contestants
Miss USA winners
People from Frisco, Texas